Sociedad Deportiva Eibar (in ) is a professional Spanish football club based in Eibar, Gipuzkoa, in the autonomous Basque Country.

Founded on 30 November 1940, the team currently plays in the Segunda División, the second tier of Spanish football, having been relegated from La Liga at the end of the 2020–21 season. The club played in the top tier of Spanish football for seven consecutive seasons from 2014 to 2021, and participated in 26 Segunda División seasons (a spell in the 1950s, and most of the 1990s and 2000s), spending the rest of their history competing at lower levels.

The team plays in claret and blue shirts with blue shorts (originating from the kit of FC Barcelona) and holds home games at the Ipurua Municipal Stadium. SD Eibar is a fan-owned club, with about 8,000 shareholders from 48 countries. Until SD Huesca qualified for the top flight in 2018, the club was considered the smallest to have played in Spain's top division, and its stadium had the lowest capacity of any La Liga teams. Although Eibar is the sole professional club of its town, it contests several Basque derbies with other clubs from the region.

Eibar is the only football club which has the quality certificate UNE-EN-ISO 9001.

History

Establishment
Formed by the merger of Deportivo Gallo and Unión Deportiva Eibarresa, the club was originally known as Eibar Fútbol Club, before changing to Sociedad Deportiva Eibar. During the difficult postwar years, the team played sporadically, which caused Eibar to disappear from official competitions during the 1942–43 season. Originally an irregular team, it was not until the 1943–44 season that it was reorganised into more of a full-time unit.

Tercera División
Promoted to Tercera División in 1950, Eibar achieved promotion to Segunda División three seasons later, being relegated again after a five-year stint and competing in division three for 25 of the following 28 years (in 1977 Tercera became the fourth level, after the creation of Segunda División B). In 1988, the side returned to the "silver category". That season also included a historic moment when goalkeeper José Ignacio Garmendia scored a goal in a game against Pontevedra via a kickout from his own area.

Promotion to Segunda División
After spending 18 years in a row in Segunda División, Eibar was relegated to the third division at the end of the 2005–06 campaign. However, it won its group the next season, thereby qualifying for the promotion play-offs where it won its semi-final tie against Hospitalet 2–0 and defeated Rayo Vallecano 2–1 on aggregate in the decisive round, sealing its return after just one year. Eibar finished 21st in the 2008–09 season meaning they were relegated to the Segunda Division B.

Relegation to Segunda B (2009–13)
Eibar qualified for three straight promotion play-offs but could not get promoted to the Segunda División.

In the 2012–13 edition of the Copa del Rey, Eibar ousted Basque neighbours Athletic Bilbao – who had appeared in two of the last four finals in the tournament – on the away goals rule to reach the round-of-16 following a 1–1 draw at the San Mamés Stadium. The decisive goal was scored by Mikel Arruabarrena who played youth football with the opposition, as did manager Gaizka Garitano; the same season the team managed to return to the "silver category", following a four-year absence.

Segunda División and promotion to La Liga
In 2013–14 Eibar earned, for the first time in its history, one of two direct promotion berths to La Liga, which was certified on 25 May 2014 with a 1–0 home win against Deportivo Alavés. (they celebrated their feat with confetti originally produced by Barcelona, who wear the same colours and had anticipated winning the Spanish league title a week earlier, but that did not come to pass). Simultaneously, however, the club was threatened with relegation back to division three due to the financial inability of the S.A.D. to have a share capital of at least €2,146,525.95 before 6 August 2014. The club launched a campaign named Defiende al Eibar (Defend Eibar) with the aim of reaching the required share capital through a seasoned equity offering. On 15 July 2014 the club announced it had reached the established goal.

Eibar finished its first top-flight season in 18th, ending in relegation. However, after the season ended, 13th-placed Elche were sent to the second tier as punishment for financial mismanagement, and Eibar were reinstated.

On 18 July 2015, Eibar played its 75th Anniversary game against Celtic in Ipurua (1–4). This included an inaugural ceremony on the pitch with a parade of 19th-century-clothed Basque soldiers with a Saltire and bagpipes playing "Scotland the Brave", with officials from both clubs shooting a 350 kg 19th-century cannon. Eibar stated that they invited Celtic as their opponent for the game due to the strong connection between the Basque Country and Scotland, and also due to the Scottish presence in Eibar through the years (the main supporter group is named "Eskozia la Brava", meaning "Scotland the Brave").

Under its new coach José Luis Mendilibar, Eibar finished its second top-flight season in 14th. Borja Bastón finished top ten in scoring and was named La Liga Player of the Month of October 2015, making him the first Armero to receive the award. In April 2017, Dani García  became the first player to reach the milestone of 100 top division appearances for the club.

The club's 10th place in 2016–17 was improved to 9th the following season, with the latter campaign marking the first time ever that Eibar had finished as the highest-ranking of the Basque teams.

On 16 May 2021, Eibar was relegated after a defeat to Valencia. This ended their seven-year stay in the top tier. The following season in Segunda, Eibar was in the top two of the league for the majority of the season, however, the team had to eventually settle for third place. In the playoffs, Eibar lost to Girona, and failed to make an immediate return to La Liga.

Affiliated clubs

Vitoria

In 2015, the club signed a collaboration agreement with CD Vitoria (Tercera División) to act as an Eibar feeder team for emerging players. Eibar had previously disbanded their own B team in 2012 to cut costs while the senior side languished in Segunda División B but decided to seek a new formal arrangement for a subsidiary club after retaining their place in La Liga. Within two years of the partnership, Vitoria gained promotion to the third tier for the first time in their history; they were relegated in 2018–19 and their home matches back in the Tercera División were then moved to Eibar.

Eibar Urko

In summer 2016, the club expanded its club structure further by integrating local team Urkomendi (of the 6th level Preferente de Guipúzcoa) into the organisation as a reserve team to act as a link between the youth level and Vitoria, to be known as Eibar Urko.

Playing in the town's Unbe Sports Complex, Eibar Urko gained promotion to the provincial fifth level in 2018, but were blocked from a further promotion after Vitoria were relegated to the same due to rules preventing teams owned by the same club competing in the same division. This also meant Urko could not be promoted in the 2019–20 or 2020–21 seasons either, as Vitoria failed to achieve the same goal.

Logroñés
Also in 2016, Eibar made a 3-year collaboration agreement with UD Logroñés, with Eibar players going on loan to the Segunda B club for experience with the aim of achieving promotion due to the additional talent in the squad. Four players made the move that summer: goalkeeper Jon Ander, defender Amelibia, midfielder Sergio García and winger Thaylor.

Season to season

*Avoided relegation to the second tier after the 2014–15 season due to Elche's administrative relegation because of tax problems.

7 seasons in La Liga
28 seasons in Segunda División
7 seasons in Segunda División B
28 seasons in Tercera División
13 seasons in Categorías Regionales

Honours
Segunda División
 2013–14
Segunda División B
 1987–88, 2006–07, 2010–11
Tercera División 
 1950–51, 1952–53, 1961–62, 1962–63, 1966–67
Tercera División
 1981–82, 1985–86

Notes

Current squad

Reserve team

On loan

Stadium
Eibar's home stadium is Estadio Municipal de Ipurua, which seats 8,164 spectators.

Famous players

Note: this list includes players that have appeared in at least 100 league games and/or have reached international status.

Club officials

Current technical staff

Board of directors 
{| class="wikitable"
|-
!Office
!Name
|-
| President
| Amaia Gorostiza
|-
| Vice president
| Joseba Unamuno
|-
| Secretary
| Jon Ander Ulazia
|-
|rowspan=8| Directors
| Virginia Arakistain
|-
| Leire Barriuso
|-
| J. A. Fernández
|-
| Javier Gurrutxaga
|-
| Agustín Lahidalga
|-
| Antón Martinena
|-
| Alex Martínez
|-
| Javier Sarrionandia

Coaches

Presidents

See also
CD Vitoria, Eibar's reserve team.
SD Eibar (women), Eibar's women's team

References

External links

 Official website 
 Eibar at La Liga 
 Eibar at UEFA 
 Club profile at BDfutbol (match reports in each season)
 Futbolme team profile 

 
Football clubs in the Basque Country (autonomous community)
Association football clubs established in 1940
1940 establishments in Spain
La Liga clubs
Sport in Gipuzkoa
Segunda División clubs